Timothy Noel Richardson (born 18 September 1988) is an Australian politician. He has been a Labor Party member of the Victorian Legislative Assembly since November 2014, representing the Legislative Assembly seat of Mordialloc.

Personal life

Richardson is married and has a young daughter. Richardson was the first member of his family to attend university; he attained a Bachelor of Laws/Bachelor of Commerce from Deakin University.

Parliamentary career

Richardson was elected to Parliament representing Mordialloc with the Labor party's victory at the 2014 Victorian State election, defeating incumbent Lorraine Wreford who had held the seat since 2010 with a swing of 3.6%. As of the 2014 election Richardson held his seat with a margin of 2.1%. Richardson gave his inaugural speech to the Victorian Legislative Assembly as the new member for Mordialloc on 23 December 2014.

Upon the election of the Andrews Labor Government, Richardson was appointed to the Committee for the Environment, Natural Resources and Regional Development, as well as the Independent Broad-Based Anti-corruption Commission Committee.

He was re-elected again in 2018 and 2022.

Richardson was one of six Labor MPs to vote against the legalisation of euthanasia in Victoria.

Originally a member of Labor Right, Richardson defected to Labor Left along with six of his colleagues shortly after the 2022 Victorian state election; the defections of his colleagues and himself meant that Labor Left constituted a majority of the state Labor caucus.

References

External links
Parliament of Victoria - Legislative Assembly - Tim Richardson MP

1988 births
Living people
Australian Labor Party members of the Parliament of Victoria
Labor Left politicians
Members of the Victorian Legislative Assembly
Politicians from Melbourne
Deakin University alumni
21st-century Australian politicians